Gafsele is a small Swedish village in Åsele Municipality, Västerbotten County, in the province of Lapland in northern Sweden, old spelling Gavsele. Gafsele was founded by the Nils Andersson from Finland and his wife Brita in 1674.

Nils arrived from Finland (that was a part of Sweden at the time) as he wanted to avoid being drafted into the war with Russia. Instead, he worked his way up the Angerman river until he reached Lapland, where the government promised any man that settled to be tax-free for 10 years. 
At that time, Lapplander (Sami) people already lived in the area, but as they were raising reindeers and Nils was farming, they could live together mainly without conflict.

Nils and his wife Brita are said to bring one cow, that they kept during the summer on a small island in the river called Koholmen (small cow island). Before the winter they built a small cottage on what is now called Skoludden, and settled. 
Brita, Nils wife was famous for her hot temper and for bringing some non-Christian behaviors to the village, such as blessings of the crops, and was brought to justice for this, but Nils talked the court out of it. It could otherwise have been fatal, as the penalty for such behavior in principle was death.  

The most famous story about Nils is the day he saw a small splinter coming down the river and he understood that there was some other settler upstream.  He immediately went there and scared the person off, as he believed that everything upstream belonged to him. Later, of course, more settlements were done upstreams, but Gafsele remained one of the bigger. 

Today Gafsele has seen its heyday, and have a population of around 120 people, most engaged with forestry, farming, working for the municipality or retirees. There is one potato farmer. The village is spread out on both sides of the Ångerman river, with a bridge built 1967 in between. Near the bridge, on the east side, is the community house of the village, and on the west side you can visit the old sawmill that is still functional. Both places are open for many activities during the year. 

Most popular sports in the village is fishing, hunting, and snow mobile riding. Other buildings of interest are the school with its park. The school is no longer in use, and is now transformed into a hostel. There is also a small village bakery with an old fashioned stone oven that is still used by the village people to bake the traditional flat bread.

External links
 Gafsele Homepage

Populated places in Västerbotten County